Beijing Institute of Technology (abbreviated BIT; Simplified Chinese: 北京理工大学), is a national leading co-educational public university located in Beijing, China. It was established in 1940 in Yan'an, Shaanxi. It is a major research university under the supervision of the Ministry of Industry and Information Technology.

BIT is a Chinese Ministry of Education Class A Double First Class University. As a member of Double First Class University Plan, Project 985 and Project 211 it is a leading multi discipline university given priority sponsorship from the Ministry of Education and the Beijing Municipal Government.

BIT is ranked 201-300th in the WURI Global Top 100 Innovative Universities Ranking of 2021.

History

Yan'an period (1940–1946)

Beijing Institute of Technology (BIT) has its origins in the Yan'an Research Academy of Natural Sciences (延安自然科学研究院).  BIT was established May 1939 in Yan'an, Shaanxi by the Chinese Communist Party with the aim of training science and engineering professionals. In January 1940 when China was undergoing the most difficult phase of the War of Resistance Against Japan the Central Committee of the Chinese Communist Party reformed the Yan'an Research Academy of Natural Sciences into the Yan'an Academy of Natural Sciences (延安自然科学院). The mission of the academy was to assist industrial development in the Shanxi-Chahar-Hebei Border Region. Opened on 1 September 1940 it was the first science and engineering university founded by the Chinese Communist Party. Li Fuchun, secretary of the CCP Committee for Shaan-Gan-Ning Border Region, was appointed as the first president and was succeeded by educationist Xu Teli.

During the founding period the Yan'an Academy of Natural Sciences received support from international organizations and individuals including Rewi Alley.

In March 1943 the Yan'an Academy of Natural Sciences merged with the newly founded University of Yan'an (延安大学) and was named the School of Natural Sciences University of Yan'an (延安大学自然科学院).

At the end of 1945 the University of Yan'an moved to the north of China.

Shanxi-Chahar-Hebei Border Region period (1946–1949)
In January 1946 the School of Natural Sciences moved to Zhangjiakou. The Central Bureau of Shanxi-Chahar-Hebei Border Region decided to settle the School at Zhangjiakou and merged it with Shanxi-Chahar-Hebei Border Region College of Technology (晋察冀边区工科专门学校) to form the Shanxi-Chahar-Hebei Border Region College (晋察冀边区工业专门学校).

At the end of the same year the Shanxi-Chahar-Hebei Border Region Institute moved to Hebei and merged with the Shanxi-Chahar-Hebei Border Region Academy of Railway (晋察冀边区铁路学院) to form the Shanxi-Chahar-Hebei Border Region College of Industry and Transportation (晋察冀工业交通学院). One year later the Shanxi-Chahar-Hebei Border Region Institute moved to Jingxing County and was renamed the Shanxi-Chahar-Hebei Border Region Bureau of Industry College of Technology (晋察冀边区工业局工业学校). In August 1948 it merged with the Institute of Technology Northern University (北方大学工学院) to form the Institute of Technology North China University (华北大学工学院).

Institute of Technology North China University period (1949–1952) 

The Institute of Technology North China University made its final move to Beijing and confirmed its academic focus on industrial development for the newly founded People's Republic of China. It was administrated by the Ministry of Industry and became the first university specializing in heavy industry since the foundation of the PRC.

The home campus of Sino-French University (中法大学) and its Departments of Mathematics, Physics and Chemistry were merged into the Institute of Technology North China University in October 1950.

Beijing Institute of Technology period (1952–1988) 
On 1 January 1952 the Institute of Technology North China University was officially renamed the Beijing Institute of Technology (北京工业学院). On 8 March 1952 the Ministry of Heavy Industry declared that the Beijing Institute of Technology would be developed into a higher educational institute specializing in national defense. The Beijing Institute of Technology established a number of weapon science and technology disciplines, including China's first rocket and missile program, with the help of scientists such as Qian Xuesen. Several departments were terminated and many were transferred to other universities such as China Agricultural University (1947), Beijing Steel and Iron Institute (1952) and Beijing University of Aeronautics and Astronautics (1952). In 1959 the Beijing Institute of Technology was singled out as one of 16 “national key universities” that were authorized to offer graduate degrees.

During the Cultural Revolution most research at Beijing Institute of Technology came to a halt but quickly resumed after 1976.

Post-economic reform period (1988–present) 

In 1988 the institution changed its Chinese name from "Institute" to "University" (北京理工大学) while the English name remained unchanged. In 1991 BIT was chosen as one of the 14 national key universities to receive special supports from the Chinese government during the Eighth Five-Year Plan.

In December 1995 BIT was ratified by the Chinese government as one of the 15 first-tier "Project 211" universities. In 1996 BIT became one of the first 32 Chinese universities to officially run graduate schools. In the same year BIT was designated as one of the 27 national key universities during the Ninth Five-Year Plan. In 1999 BIT's undergraduate education was evaluated as "Excellent" in the assessment organized by the Chinese Ministry of Education.

In 2000, BIT was the tenth university to be admitted into "Project 985" which aimed to promote the development and reputation of the Chinese higher education system by founding world-class universities in the 21st century through prioritized supports from both national and local government funding. In the same year BIT was also designated as one of the top 22 universities in the "21st Century Education Promotion" plan during the Tenth Five-Year Plan.

BIT was administered by the Commission of Science, Technology and Industry for National Defense. Since 2008 it is administered by the newly founded Ministry of Industry and Information Technology.

In November 2010, along with 8 other Project 985 universities, BIT officially formed the Excellence League, an alliance of 10 Chinese universities with strong background in engineering.

BIT is traditionally strong in national defense and military technologies research, especially radar, missiles and armored combat vehicles but also maintained outstanding research strength in electrical engineering, automation, photonics, mechanical engineering, chemical engineering, computer science and industrial design.

As of 2015 BIT has established cooperation with more than 200 universities from 58 countries and implemented student exchange programs with more than 40 universities in the world including the Technical University of Munich, Bauman Moscow State Technical University, Tokyo Institute of Technology, University of California and The Australian National University.

Campus

Zhongguancun, Beijing 

BIT's main campus is located in the Zhuongguancun area of Beijing.  This area is known for its high concentration of universities, research institutions and high-tech companies as well as knowledge and information industries which give it the name of Silicon Valley of China. BIT is adjacent to the National Library of China, Zhongguancun Science Park and universities such as Renmin University, China Agricultural University, Beijing Foreign Studies University and Minzu University of China.

Zhongguangcun campus has an area of 920,700 square meters, including a floor space of 724,000 square meters. It is the oldest campus of BIT. Since the opening of Liangxiang campus in 2007 Zhongguancun campus is mainly used to host higher year undergraduate students and postgraduate students.

Liangxiang, Beijing 

Since 2007 undergraduate students are located on the Liangxiang campus which is based in Liangxiang University Town, Fangshan District of Beijing.

Xishan, Beijing 
Xishan Laboratory Research Center is located in Beijing.

Fangshan, Beijing 
The BIT Fangshan campus was co-founded by BIT and the Fangshan District government and is located in the Fangshan District of Beijing.

Qinhuangdao, Hebei 
Founded in 1984 Qinhuangdao campus offers one-year pre-university program for ethnic minority students whose first language is not Mandarin.  Qinhuangdao campus also accepts pre-university ethnic minority students who will apply to Beihang University, Nanjing University of Aeronautics and Astronautics, Nanjing University of Science and Technology, Harbin Institute of Technology, Harbin Engineering University and Northwestern Polytechnical University.

Zhuhai, Guangdong 

The Zhuhai campus is based in the Guangdong province of China. The speciality of Zhuhai campus lies in providing continuing education, distance learning courses and special courses related to the local economy and industry. It is home to many research institutions including a graduate school and a science park. BITZH- CUHK Optomechatronic Engineering Joint Research Center and BITZH- HKPU City and Public Security Joint Research Center are also located in Zhuhai campus.

Academics

Demographics

Student demographics (as of the year 2010)
Total Full-time students: 23,003
Undergraduates: 14,010
Master students: 5,504
Doctoral students: 2,701
International students: 426
Faculty and staff demographics (as of the year 2010)
Total: more than 3,442
Faculty: 1,953
Fellows of Chinese Academy of Sciences or Chinese Academy of Engineering: 13
Chang Jiang Scholars: 22
Professors (including researchers and professorial senior engineers): 376
Associate professors (including associate researchers and senior engineers): 906
National experts with outstanding contributions: 18
Outstanding junior scientists: 13
Recipients of special subsidies from the central government: 251
 BIT also appointed 174 visiting professors, 38 advisory professors and 6 honorary professors in China, as well as 45 international visiting professors and 12 honorary international professors.

Education

BIT has 16 national key disciplines and 25 ministry-level key disciplines. BIT offers bachelor's degrees in 60 majors, Master's degrees in 144 majors and Doctorate degrees in 62 majors. It also has 17 post-doctorate stations.

Research
BIT's research strength lies in electrical engineering, information engineering, automation, photonics, mechanical Engineering, vehicle engineering, aerospace engineering and chemical engineering. Emerging research areas developed in recent years include Computer Science, Industrial Design and Higher education research.

BIT has five national key laboratories (research centers), six national defense key laboratories (research centers), two MOST key laboratories (research centers) and four Beijing municipal key laboratories (research centers). It also has a national key science park. The annual research expenditure in 2004 was more than 620 million RMB.

BIT is one of the Seven Sons of National Defence.

Rankings

BIT is ranked among the top 20 universities in China and top 300 in the world. In recent national level evaluations BIT was among the first 15 universities to be designated into the "Project 211". It is also the tenth university to be designated into the prestigious "Project 985". Together with Tsinghua University, Peking University, Beihang University and University of Chinese Academy of Sciences, it is widely considered to be one of the top engineering universities in Beijing. 

According to the China Discipline Ranking conducted by a research center affiliated with the China Ministry of Education, BIT ranks among top 10 nationally in the following ten disciplines:
 Information Engineering: ranked fifth.
 Optical Engineering: ranked fifth.
 Aerospace Science and Engineering: ranked fifth.
 Mechanical Engineering: ranked seventh.
 Metallurgical Engineering: ranked seventh.
 Transportation and Traffic Engineering: ranked ninth.
 Instrument Sciences and Technology: ranked tenth.
 Automation Science and Engineering: ranked tenth.
 Chemical Engineering: ranked tenth.
Note: According to the ranking's classification of academic disciplines, BIT was evaluated in about 20 disciplines.

Library
Established in 1940 the BIT library now consists of one main library and four branch libraries. Nine new branch libraries are in construction or planning.

Renovation of the main library was completed in 2006. The state-of-the-art building has an area of 25,509 square meters and is covered by a wireless network. It has a collection of more than 3 million items, including 1.13 million electronic items.

Press
The BIT Press was established in 1985 and has published more than 3,000 books. Most of the books published by BIT press are in the area of natural science and technology. The current director for the press is Yang Zhijian.

Student life

Student housing 

All undergraduate and postgraduate students at BIT are guaranteed university accommodation. Allocation is normally based on the students' major, year and class. First and second year undergraduate students are based at Liangxiang campus. Higher year undergraduate students and postgraduate students are based at Zhongguancun campus. Both campuses provide staff accommodation.

Notable alumni
Among the 100,000 BIT alumni there are Fellows of the Chinese Academy of Science and Chinese Academy of Engineering, officials with rank higher than provincial governor and generals of the Chinese military.

Politicians
 Li Peng, former Premier and Chairman of the National People's Congress (NPC) of China
 Liu Zhenqi, Chinese Air Force general (shang jiang)
 Ni Zhifu, former Vice Chairman of the National People's Congress
 Ye Xuanping, vice-president of the Chinese People's Political Consultative Conference (CPPCC). Former Governor of Guangdong
 Zeng Qinghong, former vice-president of China
 Zou Jiahua, former Vice-Premier of the China

Scientists
 Wang Xiaomo, Winner of The State Preeminent Science and Technology Award of China, and also the only one attended college after 1949 among all winners till 2014, Father of Chinese Airborne early warning and control system.
 Duo Yingxian, Chinese "Kalashnikov" in assault rifle design.
 Huang Chunping, Director of Rocket System for the Shenzhou 5 Spacecraft.
 Mao Erke, Scientist of Radar signal processing.
 Peng Shilu, "Father of Chinese Nuclear Submarine".
 Wang Yue, Scientist in information system, information security and radar.
 Xie Guangxuan, Chief Designer of the Long March Rocket 3.
 Xu Gengguang, Scientist in bombing and explosives.
 Yang Dongping, Education reformer and TV producer.
 Zhou Liwei, Scientist in optical electronics.

Athletics

BIT has several collegiate sports teams. Its football team is widely considered one of the best in Chinese collegiate football. The team won 4 out of 6 national championships from 2001 to 2006 in the Chinese University Football League. The BIT team also represented Chinese football at the 2003 Summer Universiade Games and the 2005 Summer Universiade Games. After being promoted to the professional football league in 2006 the team has been participating in the professional Chinese Football Association Jia League. Since 2015 the international students at BIT have their own football team called the BIT International FC.

The Eastern Athletic Field is the home field for Beijing Institute of Technology FC. It is mostly used for the team's home games. The field is also open to students and staff of BIT.

See also
Project 985

References

External links 

International Students Center
Website of the BIT Press 
Website of the BIT Library 

Beijing Institute of Technology
Universities and colleges in Haidian District
Educational institutions established in 1940
1940 establishments in China
Project 985
Vice-ministerial universities in China